The 1974 Bexley Council election took place on 2 May 1974 to elect members of Bexley London Borough Council in London, England. The whole council was up for election and the Conservative party gained overall control of the council.

Background
Construction of the Thamesmead estate led to a new ward being created for this election, Thamesmead East returning three councilors.

Election result

Ward results

References

1974
1974 London Borough council elections